Turkmenistan competed at the 2019 World Championships in Athletics in Doha, Qatar, from 27 September-6 October 2019, with their sole athlete, Irina Velihanova, competing in the women's 100m hurdles event.

Background 
Prior to 2019, Turkmenistan had competed at the IAAF World Athletics Championships on eleven occasions, participating since 1993 and failing to send a delegation in 1997 and 2013.  Before 1993, the nation's athletes competed as part of the Soviet Union team. The country has not won any medals at the competition and as of 2017, none of the country's athletes have progressed beyond the first round.

Results 

 Key

 Note–Ranks given for track events are within the athlete's heat only
 Q= Qualified for the next round
 q= Qualified for the next round as a fastest loser or, in field events, by position without achieving the qualifying target
 NR= National record
 PB= Personal best
 N/A = Round not applicable for the event
 Bye = Athlete not required to compete in round

Women 
Track events

References 

 
Turkmenistan
World Championships in Athletics